The Stanton Group is a group of small rocky islands close to the coast at the east side of Utstikkar Bay, 4 nautical miles (7 km) northeast of Falla Bluff discovered in February 1931 by the British Australian New Zealand Antarctic Research Expedition (BANZARE) under Mawson. He named it for A. M. Stanton, first officer of the Discovery, 1930–31.

Islands of Mac. Robertson Land